is a Japanese musician, best known for playing the bass guitar for Southern All Stars. As a solo artist, he has played ukulele. He is a fan of Hawaiian music, and is the founder of the annual Ukulele Picnic music festival in Hawaii. For over thirty years, Sekiguchi has worked with Akira Sakuma in the Momotaro Dentetsu video game series as a music composer.

Singles

Kazuyuki Sekiguchi featuring Leyona
HOTEL PACIFIC (2001)

Kazuyuki Sekiguchi featuring KONISHIKI
Watashi-no Aozora ~MY BLUE HEAVEN~ (私の青空 ～MY BLUE HEAVEN～ 'My Blue Sky ~MY BLUE HEAVEN~' 2002)

Original albums
Sakin (砂金 'Gold dust' 1986)
Ukulele Caravan (2012)
FREE-UKES (2022)

Albums

Captain Mook and The Ala Moana Strings
UKULELE CALENDAR (1997)
Featuring Petty Booka.

Kazuyuki Sekiguchi featuring Naoto Takenaka
Kuchibue to Ukulele (口笛とウクレレ 'Whistle and Ukulele' 2000)

Kazuyuki Sekiguchi and Sazan All Stars
World Hits!? of Southern All Stars (2001)

Kazuyuki Sekiguchi featuring Naoto Takenaka and Kimiko Wakeyama	
Kuchibue to Ukulele 2 (口笛とウクレレ2 'Whistle and Ukelele 2' 2008)

Video game music
All works below were composed solely by Sekiguchi unless otherwise noted.

References

1955 births
Japanese bass guitarists
Southern All Stars members
Aoyama Gakuin University alumni
Living people
Musicians from Niigata Prefecture
Amuse Inc. talents
Male bass guitarists